St. Peter and Paul is a Gothic church in the quarter of Detwang in the Bavarian tourist resort of Rothenburg ob der Tauber in the Tauber valley. The most important piece of artwork in the church is the crucifixion reredos by Tilman Riemenschneider. The church is a cultural heritage monument of Germany.

Crucifixion reredos 
Only fragments of the crucifixion copies have survived to the present day. It depicts the crucifixion of Christ but there is no record of its origin. However, it has been attributed to Tilman Riemenschneider and his workshop due to its close stylistic relationship to his other works. The sculptural decoration is dated to the years 1505 and 1508 and was therefore created at the same time as Creglingen's Marian reredos.

References

Sources 
 Iris Kalden-Rosenfeld: Tilman Riemenschneider und seine Werkstatt, Die Blauen Bücher, 3rd ed., 2006

External links 

 Tourist information

Detwang PeterPaul
Detwang PeterPaul
Detwang PeterPaul
Detwang PeterPaul